is a town located in Higashimatsuura District, Saga Prefecture, Japan. It has an area of 36.00 km² and as of February 28, 2017 has a population of 5,855. It is currently the only municipality in Higashimatsuura District. There was a town with the same name in Fukuoka Prefecture, but it now no longer exists.

History
September 30, 1956 - The villages of Chika and Ariura merge to form the town of Genkai.
December 31, 1957 - The neighborhoods of Sosorogawachi, Yunoo, Fujihira, Tashiro from the village of Kirigo are incorporated into Genkai. Kirigo's remaining neighborhoods are incorporated into Karatsu.

The great Heisei merger
All other towns and villages from Higashimatsuura District were incorporated into Karatsu between 2005 and 2006. Genkai originally planned to merge into Karatsu with the rest of the district, but was concerned about the slow administrative response of the surrounding areas. Eventually they withdrew their decision to merge and decided to continue as an autonomous municipality. Genkai is now enjoying a relatively high amount of revenue from the Genkai Nuclear Power Plant, built in 1975, but there is a question as to its administration in the future.

Geography

The town is located on the northwestern edge of the prefecture on the Higashimatsuura Peninsula and faces the Genkai Sea on its west side. Genkai is home to one of sixteen nuclear power plants in Japan, with the only other nuclear power plant in the Kyūshū area being located in Kagoshima Prefecture. It is the only town in the Higashimatsuura District of Saga that has not merged with Karatsu.

Adjoining municipalities
Karatsu

Education
Genkai has one public high school overseen by the prefectural government, and one combined elementary/middle school operated by the city government.

Previously home to four elementary schools and two junior highschools, in 2017 these schools were amalgamated into Genkai Mirai.  Opened on April 1, 2015, the school had 498 students from grades 1 - 9 across 19 classes and 6 special needs classes.

Current

Prefectural high schools

 Karatsu Seishō High School (佐賀県立唐津青翔高等学校)

Municipal school 

 Genkai Mirai Gakuen (玄海みらい学園)

Previously

Municipal junior high schools

Ariura Junior High School (有浦中学校)
Chiga Junior High School (値賀中学校)

Municipal elementary schools

Ariura Elementary School (有浦小学校)
Chiga Elementary School (値賀小学校)
Kariya Elementary School (仮屋小学校)
Mukata Elementary School (牟形小学校)

Transportation

Rail
There are no train stations in Genkai.

Bus 
Local public buses are run by the SHOWA bus company. School buses are available for all students attending Genkai Mirai.

Road
National highways
Route 204
Main prefectural roads
Hizen-Yobuko Route 47

Scenic and historic places
Kaijō Onsen Parea (海上温泉パレア)
 Hamanoura Rice Terraces (浜野浦の棚田)
Genkai Energy Park (玄海エネルギーパーク)

References

External links

 Genkai official website  

Towns in Saga Prefecture